is a city located in Shizuoka Prefecture, Japan. ,  the city had an estimated population of 88,395 in 34,842 households, and a population density of 820 persons per km². Fukuroi is a member of the World Health Organization’s Alliance for Healthy Cities  (AFHC).

Geography
Fukuroi is on the coastal plain in southwestern Shizuoka Prefecture. It has a small coastline on the Pacific Ocean to the south.

Surrounding municipalities
Shizuoka Prefecture
Kakegawa
Iwata
Mori

Demographics
Per Japanese census data, the population of Fukuroi has been steadily increasing over the past 50 years.

Climate
The area has a mild maritime climate with hot, humid summers, and short, cool winters.  (Köppen climate classification Cfa).  The average annual temperature in Fukuroi is 16.3 °C. The average annual rainfall is 2084 mm with September as the wettest month. The temperatures are highest on average in August, at around 27.2 °C, and lowest in January, at around 6.1 °C.

History
During the Sengoku period, Fukuroi was part of the domain within Tōtōmi Province governed by Yamauchi Kazutoyo from Kakegawa Castle. During the Edo period, the area was tenryō territory under direct control of the Tokugawa shogunate. The settlement prospered as Fukuroi-juku on the Tōkaidō highway connecting Edo with Kyoto. After the Meiji Restoration, in with the 1889 establishment of the modern municipalities system, Fukuroi-juku became the town of Yamana within Yamana District, Shizuoka Prefecture. Yamana District was merged into Iwata District in 1896, and the town's name was changed back to Fukuroi in 1909.  Fukuroi merged with the neighboring village of Kasai in 1928. It continued to grow in the 1950s, annexing neighboring villages of Kudonishi (from Shuchi District) in 1948, Kudo in 1952, Imai in 1954, Mikawa in 1955, Tahara in 1956, as well as the village of Kasahara from Ogasa District, also in 1956. On November 3, 1958, Fukuroi was elevated to city status. It further expanded through annexation of the town of Yamanashi from Shuchi District in 1963.

During the 2002 FIFA World Cup, as location of (Shizuoka Stadium), Fukuroi played host of some of the events.
 
On April 1, 2005, the town of Asaba (from Iwata District) was merged into Fukuroi.

Government
Fukuroi has a mayor-council form of government with a directly elected mayor and a unicameral city legislature of 20 members.

Economy
Fukuroi has a mixed economy of agriculture and light industry. The principal crops are green tea and melons. Industry includes food processing, cosmetics, pharmaceutical plants, as well as electronics and automotive components.

Education
Shizuoka Institute of Science and Technology
Fukuroi has twelve public elementary schools and four public middle schools operated by the city government and two public high schools operated by the Shizuoka Prefectural Board of Education. In addition, the prefecture also operates a special education school. The city formerly hosted a Brazilian primary school, Escola CONHECER, which is now closed

Transportation

Railway
 Central Japan Railway Company - Tōkaidō Main Line
  -

Highways
  Tōmei Expressway

Sister city relations
  Narakawa, Kiso District, Nagano (now the city of Shiojiri)—Signed on October 28, 2001
  Hillsboro, Oregon, United States—Signed on November 3, 1988

Notable people from Fukuroi

 Junya Kuno, professional soccer player
 Hakuo Yanagisawa, politician

References

External links

  

 
Cities in Shizuoka Prefecture
Populated coastal places in Japan